The 2022 Newcastle Knights season was the 35th in the club's history. Coached by Adam O'Brien and co-captained by Jayden Brailey and Kalyn Ponga, they competed in the NRL's 2022 Telstra Premiership, finishing the regular season in 14th place (out of 16).

Squad

Transfers and Re-signings

Gains

Losses

Promoted juniors

Change of role

Re-signings

Player contract situations

Ladder

Milestones
 Round 1: Adam Clune made his debut for the club, after previously playing for the St. George Illawarra Dragons.
 Round 1: Kurt Mann played his 150th career game.
 Round 1: Leo Thompson made his NRL debut for the club.
 Round 2: Tyson Frizell captained his 1st game for the club.
 Round 2: Jacob Saifiti played his 100th career game.
 Round 4: Tyson Frizell played his 200th career game.
 Round 4: Adam O'Brien coached his 50th career game.
 Round 5: Enari Tuala played his 50th game for the club.
 Round 10: Adam Clune scored his 1st try for the club.
 Round 11: Anthony Milford made his debut for the club, after previously playing for the Brisbane Broncos.
 Round 15: Mat Croker scored his 1st career try.
 Round 16: Edrick Lee scored 5 tries, breaking the club record of most tries scored in a match by one player for the Knights.
 Round 16: Anthony Milford kicked his 1st goal for the club.
 Round 17: David Klemmer scored his 1st try for the club.
 Round 18: Anthony Milford played his 200th career game.
 Round 22: Jayden Brailey played his 100th career game.
 Round 23: Oryn Keeley made his NRL debut for the club.
 Round 23: Krystian Mapapalangi made his NRL debut for the club.

Jerseys and sponsors
In 2022, the Knights' jerseys were made by O'Neills and their major sponsor was nib Health Funds.

Fixtures

Pre-season Trials

Source:

Statistics

31 players used.

Source:

NRL Women's team

2021 season

Women's Gains 2021

Women's Ladder 2022

Women's Milestones 2021
 Round 1: Phoebe Desmond made her NRLW debut for the club and scored her 1st career try.
 Round 1: Kirra Dibb made her debut for the club, after previously playing for the New Zealand Warriors and kicked her 1st goal for the club.
 Round 1: Rangimarie Edwards-Bruce made her NRLW debut for the club.
 Round 1: Jayme Fressard made her debut for the club, after previously playing for the Brisbane Broncos.
 Round 1: Katie Green made her NRLW debut for the club.
 Round 1: Caitlan Johnston made her debut for the club, after previously playing for the Sydney Roosters.
 Round 1: Bobbi Law made her debut for the club, after previously playing for the Sydney Roosters.
 Round 1: Emma Manzelmann made her NRLW debut for the club.
 Round 1: Annetta Nu'uausala made her debut for the club, after previously playing for the New Zealand Warriors.
 Round 1: Georgia Page made her debut for the club, after previously playing for the St. George Illawarra Dragons.
 Round 1: Charntay Poko made her debut for the club, after previously playing for the New Zealand Warriors and kicked her 1st career goal.
 Round 1: Krystal Rota made her debut for the club, after previously playing for the New Zealand Warriors.
 Round 1: Charlotte Scanlan made her NRLW debut for the club.
 Round 1: Autumn-Rain Stephens-Daly made her NRLW debut for the club.
 Round 1: Romy Teitzel made her debut for the club, after previously playing for the Brisbane Broncos, scored her 1st career try and captained her 1st game for the club.
 Round 1: Tahlulah Tillett made her NRLW debut for the club.
 Round 1: Katelyn Vaha'akolo made her NRLW debut for the club.
 Round 2: Ngatokotoru Arakua made her debut for the club, after previously playing for the St. George Illawarra Dragons.
 Round 2: Maitua Feterika made her debut for the club, after previously playing for the St. George Illawarra Dragons and scored her 1st try for the club.
 Round 2: Jayme Fressard scored her 1st career try.
 Round 3: Annetta Nu'uausala scored her 1st try for the club.
 Round 4: Kyra Simon made her NRLW debut for the club.
 Round 4: Autumn-Rain Stephens-Daly scored her 1st career try.
 Round 4: Kararaina Wira-Kohu made her NRLW debut for the club.
 Round 5: Shannon Evans made her NRLW debut for the club.
 Round 5: Chantelle Graham made her NRLW debut for the club.
 Round 5: Paige Parker made her NRLW debut for the club and scored her 1st career try.
 Round 5: Katelyn Vaha'akolo scored her 1st career try.

Women's Statistics 2021

24 players used.

Source:

2022 season

Women's Gains 2022

Women's Losses 2022

Women's Change of role 2022

Women's Re-signings 2022

Women's Ladder 2022

Women's Milestones 2022
 Round 1: Millie Boyle made her debut for the club, after previously playing for the Brisbane Broncos and captained her 1st game for the club.
 Round 1: Yasmin Clydsdale made her debut for the club, after previously playing for the Sydney Roosters.
 Round 1: Olivia Higgins made her debut for the club, after previously playing for the Sydney Roosters.
 Round 1: Caitlan Johnston scored her 1st career try.
 Round 1: Simone Karpani made her debut for the club, after previously playing for the Sydney Roosters.
 Round 1: Bobbi Law scored her 1st try for the club.
 Round 1: Shanice Parker made her debut for the club, after previously playing for the Sydney Roosters.
 Round 1: Tayla Predebon made her debut for the club, after previously playing for the Sydney Roosters and scored her 1st career try.
 Round 1: Hannah Southwell made her debut for the club, after previously playing for the Sydney Roosters and captained her 1st game for the club.
 Round 1: Jesse Southwell made her NRLW debut for the club and scored her 1st career try. She became the youngest player to debut in NRLW history.
 Round 1: Kiana Takairangi made her debut for the club, after previously playing for the Sydney Roosters.
 Round 1: Tamika Upton made her debut for the club, after previously playing for the Brisbane Broncos.
 Round 2: Emma Manzelmann scored her 1st career try.
 Round 2: Tamika Upton scored her 1st try for the club.
 Round 2: Makenzie Weale made her NRLW debut for the club.
 Round 3: Tiana Davison made her NRLW debut for the club.
 Round 3: Olivia Higgins scored her 1st try for the club.
 Round 3: Caitlin Moran made her NRLW debut for the club.
 Round 3: Jakiya Whitfeld made her NRLW debut for the club.
 Round 4: Yasmin Clydsdale scored her 1st try for the club.
 Round 4: Emmanita Paki made her NRLW debut for the club.
 Round 4: Jesse Southwell kicked her 1st career goal.
 Round 5: Jessica Gentle made her NRLW debut for the club and scored her 1st career try.
 Round 5: Emmanita Paki scored her 1st career try.
 Round 5: Kayla Romaniuk made her NRLW debut for the club.
 Round 5: Kiana Takairangi scored her 1st career try.
 Round 5: Makenzie Weale scored her 1st career try.
 Semi Final: Millie Boyle scored her 1st try for the club.
 Semi Final: Kirra Dibb scored her 1st try for the club.
 Semi Final: Tamika Upton became the first Knight to score more than one try in a game.

Women's Statistics 2022

24 players used.

Source:

Representative honours

The following players appeared in a representative match or were named in a representative squad in 2022.

Australian Jillaroos
Millie Boyle (squad member)
Yasmin Clydsdale
Caitlan Johnston
Tamika Upton (squad member)

Cook Islands (Women's)
Kiana Takairangi

England
Dom Young

Fiji
Kurt Donoghoe (extended squad)
Daniel Saifiti (extended squad)
Jacob Saifiti (extended squad)
Tevita Toloi

Indigenous All Stars (Women's)
Bree Chester (squad member)
Kirra Dibb
Caitlan Johnston
Bobbi Law
Kyra Simon
Tahlulah Tillett

Māori All Stars
Pasami Saulo (squad member)

Māori All Stars (Women's)
Rangimarie Edwards-Bruce
Krystal Rota
Autumn-Rain Stephens-Daly
Katelyn Vaha'akolo

New South Wales Blues
Tyson Frizell (19th man)
Jacob Saifiti

New South Wales Blues (Women's)
Kirra Dibb
Caitlan Johnston

New South Wales Blues extended squad (Women's)
Bobbi Law

New Zealand Kiwi Ferns
Ngatokotoru Arakua
Annetta Nu'uausala
Shanice Parker
Charlotte Scanlan
Autumn-Rain Stephens-Daly
Katelyn Vaha'akolo
Kararaina Wira-Kohu

Papua New Guinea (Women's)
Anika Butler

Queensland Maroons
Dane Gagai
Kalyn Ponga

Queensland Maroons (Women's)
Romy Teitzel (20th man)

Queensland Maroons extended squad (Women's)
Emma Manzelmann
Romy Teitzel

Samoa
Anthony Milford

Individual honours

Newcastle Knights awards

 Player of the Year (Danny Buderus Medal): Tyson Frizell
 Excalibur Club Players' Player: David Klemmer
 Gladiator of the Year: Dom Young
 Community Player of the Year: Jayden Brailey
 Rookie of the Year: Leo Thompson
 Knight in Shining Armour: Dom Young
 NSW Cup Player of the Year: Luke Huth
 NSW Cup Excalibur Club Players' Player: Luke Huth
 Jersey Flegg Player of the Year: Thomas Cant
 Jersey Flegg Players' Player: Brock Greacen & James Johnson
 Club Person of the Year Paul Wallace

 NRLW Player of the Year 2021: Annetta Nu'uausala

 NRLW Player of the Year 2022: Shanice Parker & Jesse Southwell
 NRLW Player's Player 2022: Yasmin Clydsdale & Tamika Upton
 Harvey Norman NSW Women's Player of the Year 2022: Caitlan Johnston
 Harvey Norman NSW Women's Players' Player 2022: Caitlan Johnston
 NRLW Rookie of the Year 2022: Jesse Southwell
 NRLW Gladiator of the Year 2022: Caitlan Johnston
 NRLW Community Player of the Year 2022: Millie Boyle
 Thrive Award 2022: Caitlan Johnston

References

Newcastle Knights seasons
Newcastle Knights season
2022 NRL Women's season